Professor Anneila Isabel Sargent FRSE DSc (born Anneila Cassells, 1942, Kirkcaldy) is a Scottish–American astronomer who specializes in star formation.

Biography
Sargent was brought up in Burntisland, Fife, and schooled at Burntisland Primary School and Kirkcaldy High School. She completed a BSc Honours degree in Physics at the University of Edinburgh in 1963, and then immigrated to the United States, first studying at the University of California, Berkeley, and then from 1967 the California Institute of Technology, where she was awarded her Ph.D. She is currently the Ira S. Bowen Professor of Astronomy at Caltech and has served as director of the Owens Valley Radio Observatory and Combined Array for Research in Millimeter-wave Astronomy. She served as president of the American Astronomical Society from 2000 to 2002, continuing to serve on the council since. Sargent was the Vice President for Student Affairs at Caltech from 1 December 2007 until 2016.

Sargent was nominated in 2011 by President Obama to serve a six-year term on the National Science Board.  She has served on committees such as the NRC Committee for Astronomy and Astrophysics, the NSF Mathematical and Physical Sciences Advisory Committee, and in 1995/6 chaired the Visiting Committee to the National Radio Astronomy Observatory. She has been Chair of NASA's Space Science Advisory Committee since 1994. She is also Director of the Combined Array for Research in Millimeterwave Astronomy (CARMA).

Honours and awards
Sargent won both the NASA Public Service Medal and the Caltech Woman of the Year Award in 1998. Asteroid 18244 Anneila is named in her honor. The University of Edinburgh named her Alumnus of the Year in 2002 and conferred an honorary degree of Doctor of Science on her in 2008. Sargent was elected an Honorary Fellow of the Royal Society of Edinburgh in 2017.

She was elected a Legacy Fellow of the American Astronomical Society in 2020.  She was elected to the National Academy of Sciences in 2021.

Private life
Her husband was fellow astronomer Wallace L. W. Sargent.

References

1942 births
Living people
People from Burntisland
People educated at Kirkcaldy High School
Alumni of the University of Edinburgh
University of California, Berkeley alumni
California Institute of Technology faculty
Scottish emigrants to the United States
American women astronomers
Scottish astronomers
Scottish women scientists
Fellows of the American Astronomical Society
Members of the United States National Academy of Sciences